Parliamentary elections were held in Poland on 1 June 1969. The results, like with the other elections in communist Poland, were controlled by the communist government. The results of the 1969 election were identical to the 1965 elections and were repeated in 1972.

Results

As the other parties and "independents" were subordinate to PZPR, its control of the Sejm was total.

References

1969 in Poland
Parliamentary elections in Poland
Poland
Elections in the Polish People's Republic
June 1969 events in Europe
1969 elections in Poland